A gasholder house is a type of structure that was used to surround an iron gas holder, also known as a gasometer, in which coal gas was stored until it was needed. There are approximately a dozen of these structures—most constructed of brick in the latter-half of the 19th century—that still stand in the United States. Some examples still stand in Europe as well.

Description

Before the 1870s, most iron gasholders were constructed without a building structure, but following practices already common in New England, gasholders houses were adopted in New York. Additionally, gasholder houses were constructed in England as early as 1825, although the mild climate made them less of an advantage.

Gasholder houses were built to protect the iron gas holder from the elements, and enabled it to be built from thinner plates. A gasholder house provided a number of advantages:
 Provides a way to withstand the wind, and the forces on the thinner iron gasholder.
 Avoids snow loads on the top of the holder, and icing of the guides that controlled the vertical movement of the gasholder.
 Prevented the freezing of water in the pit around the gasholder that provides the seal to the gasholder, thus preventing the loss of gas.
 There is also some belief that a gasholder house allayed fears about explosion from the stored gas.

The gasholder house also provides economic advantage by reducing the condensation of gas in cold weather, and provided an attractive architectural element of the gas complex.

There are approximately a dozen known gasholder houses still standing in the United States, with the Troy Gas Light Company structure in Troy, New York, being one of the largest remaining structures of this type.

Extant gasholder houses

United States

 Listed on the National Register of Historic Places

Source:

Elsewhere

 Gasometer, Dresden, in Germany
 Østre Gasværk Teater, now houses a theatre, in Copenhagen, Denmark
 St. Petersburg Gas Plant, at the Obvodny Canal in Saint Petersburg, Russia
 Vienna Gasometers, now residential and commercial use, in Austria

Gallery

References

Further reading

Buildings and structures by type
Energy storage